Sir Edward George Perera Jayetileke KC was the 29th Chief Justice of Ceylon as well as the 13th Solicitor General. He was appointed in 1950 succeeding Arthur Wijewardena and was Chief Justice until 1952. He was succeeded by Alan Rose.

Jayetileke received a knighthood in 1951 for his services as Chief Justice in the 1951 New Year Honours.

References

Ceylonese Knights Bachelor
Ceylonese Queen's Counsel
Chief justices of Sri Lanka
Sinhalese judges
20th-century Sri Lankan people
J
Year of birth missing
Year of death missing